Poço Redondo is a municipality located in the Brazilian state of Sergipe. Its population is 35,122 (2020) and its area is 1,212 km², which makes it the largest municipality in that state.

References

Populated places established in 1953
Municipalities in Sergipe